Mandurah Magic is an NBL1 West club based in Mandurah, Western Australia. The club fields a team in both the Men's and Women's NBL1 West. The club is a division of Mandurah Basketball Association (MBA), the major administrative basketball organisation in the region. The Magic play their home games at Mandurah Aquatic & Recreation Centre.

Club history
Mandurah Basketball's roots date back to 1957.

The Mandurah/Peel region was represented in the State Basketball League (SBL) for the first time in 1990 in the form of a men's team known as the Kanyana Kings. The Kings saw immediate success in their first season with forward Vince Kelley and centre Carl Gonder leading them to a second-place finish and a 20–6 record. This inaugural season is still the most successful campaign in the history of the men's team, with the team having failed to finish second or higher or set such a win–loss record since. The Kanyana name was dropped in 1994 before a full rebrand to the Magic took place in 1996 alongside the inclusion of a women's team.

Season 2003 marked the club's most successful season in their 14-year history, with the women's team reaching the Women's SBL Grand Final for the first time. In the championship decider on 5 September, the Magic were defeated 73–44 by the Perry Lakes Hawks. In the game, Gemma Collins top scored for the Magic with 15 points, while Megan Thompson had 12 points. In 2004, the women were crowned minor premiers for the first time after finishing the regular season in first place with a 17–3 record. In 2005, the Magic reached their second WSBL Grand Final, where they were defeated 59–54 by the Willetton Tigers. In 2006, they were crowned minor premiers for the second time after finishing the regular season in first place with a team-best 19–3 record. They went on to reach their third WSBL Grand Final in four years, where they lost 56–53 to the Lakeside Lightning.

In 2009, the Magic reached their fourth WSBL Grand Final, after finishing the regular season in fifth place with a 13–9 record and going undefeated over the first two rounds of the finals. In the championship decider on 21 August, the Magic were defeated 73–63 by the Tigers.

In 2012, the men's team played finals basketball for the first time since 1999, after finishing the regular season in fifth place with a 16–10 record. After playing in the post-season in each of their first three years as the Kanyana Kings, the men's team made the finals just one time between 1993 and 2011.

In 2017, the women finished the regular season in second place with a 19–3 record and made their way through to their fifth WSBL Grand Final. In the championship decider on 1 September, the Magic were defeated 59–48 by the Hawks. In 2018, the Magic reached their sixth WSBL Grand Final, after finishing the regular season in sixth place with an 11–11 record and going undefeated over the first two rounds of the finals. In the championship decider on 31 August, the Magic were defeated 75–64 by the Lightning despite leading 64–54 with 5:30 remaining in the game.

In 2021, the SBL was rebranded as NBL1 West. In the inaugural NBL1 West season, the Magic men advanced out of the first round of the playoffs for the first time in club history.

Accolades
Women
Championships: Nil
Grand Final appearances: 6 (2003, 2005, 2006, 2009, 2017, 2018)
Minor premierships: 2 (2004, 2006)

Men
Championships: Nil
Grand Final appearances: Nil
Minor premierships: Nil

References

External links
 MBA's official website
 "Excitement builds in Mandurah for first game in new building" at sbl.asn.au

Basketball teams in Western Australia
NBL1 West teams
Basketball teams established in 1990
1990 establishments in Australia